Luke Tierney is an American statistician and computer scientist. A fellow of the Institute of Mathematical Statistics since 1988 and of the American Statistical Association since 1991, Tierney is currently a professor of statistics at the University of Iowa. Through his past work on programming languages such as R and Lisp, Tierney now holds a position on the developing team known as the R Core.

Education 
Tierney earned his BA and MA in mathematical sciences from Johns Hopkins University in 1977 and later his PhD in operations research from Cornell University in 1980. Formerly a statistics faculty member at Carnegie Mellon University and the University of Minnesota, he now serves as the Ralph E. Wareham Professor of Mathematical Sciences at the University of Iowa, a position he has held since 2002.

Work 
In 1990, Tierney wrote the XLispStat package using C and Lisp and has since published works such as LISP-STAT: An Object-Oriented Environment for Statistical Computing and Dynamic Graphics (Wiley Series in Probability and Statistics) describing its design and use.

Tierney has also made contributions in areas such as reference counting, vectors, and compilation for the R programming language and environment. During his time working with R, he has also become part of the R Core, a team of developers with write access to the R source. His work on Markov chains, Bioconductor, Lisp-stat and the Metropolis–Hastings algorithm have all been highly cited.

Positions, awards and recognition 
 Current member of the R Core Team
 Former editor of the Journal of Computational and Graphical Statistics from 2004 to 2006
 American Statistical Association
 Fellow since 1991
 Recipient of the 2019 Statistical Computing and Graphics Award
 Institute of Mathematical Statistics
 Fellow since 1988
 Former elected council member from 1995 to 1998
 University of Iowa
 Ralph E. Wareham Professor since 2002
 Former chair of the statistics department from 2004 to 2014

References 

Place of birth missing (living people)
Year of birth missing (living people)
Living people
Johns Hopkins University alumni
Cornell University alumni
American statisticians
American computer scientists
Fellows of the Institute of Mathematical Statistics
Fellows of the American Statistical Association
University of Iowa faculty
Carnegie Mellon University faculty
University of Minnesota faculty
R (programming language) people
Computational statisticians